Nicolaus is a masculine given name. It is a Latin, Greek and German form of Nicholas. Nicolaus may refer to:

In science:

 Nicolaus Copernicus, Polish astronomer who provided the first modern formulation of a heliocentric theory of the solar system
 Nicolaus Otto (1832 – 1891), German engineer

In mathematics:

 Nicolaus I Bernoulli, Swiss mathematician
 Nicolaus II Bernoulli, Swiss mathematician
 Nicolaus Rohlfs, 18th-century German mathematics teacher who wrote astronomical calendars

In literature:

 Nicolaus Becker, German lawyer and writer, the author of the Rheinlied
 Nicolaus of Damascus, Greek historical and philosophical writer who lived in the Augustan age

In music:

 Nicolaus Bruhns, German composer
 Nicolaus Zacharie, Italian composer of the early Renaissance

In Christianity:

 Nicolaus Ludwig Zinzendorf, German religious and social reformer and bishop of the Moravian Church
 Nicolaus Taurellus, German philosopher and theologian
 Nicolaus of Antioch, one of the seven deacons listed in The Acts of the Apostles, chapter 6, verse 5

In other fields:

 Nicolaus Delius, German philologist

Other uses
 Nicolaus, California, a small town in the United States
 Nicolaus (leafhopper), a genus of leafhoppers

See also 
Nicholas
Nicholaus
Nikolaus (given name)

References

German masculine given names
fi:Nicolaus